Željeznica may refer to:

 Željeznica (Bosna), a river in Bosnia and Herzegovina, tributary of Bosna River
 , a river in Bosnia and Herzegovina, tributary of Fojnička River
 Željeznica (Montenegro), a river in Montenegro
 Željeznica, Croatia, a village near Ivanec, Croatia